Charles Grant Gordon (21 August 1927 – 21 December 2013), was a Scottish whisky distiller, chairman and president of his family firm, William Grant & Sons.

Early life
Charles Grant Gordon was born in Glasgow on 21 August 1927, the eldest son of William Grant, and the great-grandson of the original William Grant. He was educated at Glasgow Academy and Rugby School, followed by a bachelor's degree in accounting at Glasgow University.

Career
In 1951, Gordon qualified as a chartered accountant, and then joined the family business. Following his father's death in 1953, Gordon became a director, later joined by his younger brother Sandy and by Eric Lloyd Roberts, the husband of his aunt Janet Sheed Roberts (née Gordon).

Personal life
In 1954, Gordon married Louise Eccles, and they had three sons, Grant Edward Gordon, Grant Glenn Gordon and Lloyd Grant Gordon. After Louise's death, he married Francesca Morales.

Gordon died in hospital of pneumonia in New York City on 21 December 2013.

References

External links

1927 births
2013 deaths
People educated at the Glasgow Academy
William Grant & Sons people
Scottish accountants
Deaths from pneumonia in New York City
Businesspeople from Glasgow
People educated at Rugby School
Alumni of the University of Glasgow
20th-century Scottish businesspeople